Dayalan is a 1941 Indian, Tamil-language film produced by T. R. Sundaram and directed by A. Mithra Das. The film stars P. U. Chinnappa, T. R. Mahalingam and K. V. Jayagowri.

Plot 
King Arputhavarman has two sons, Dayalan from his deceased wife and Bharathan from his second wife. He also brought up a young girl, Padmavathi. Dayalan falls in love with Padmavathi. A servant, Dunmathi, succeeds in poisoning the mind of the King and becomes the prime minister. His son Prathapan conspires with the father and plans to take over the Kingdom. Dunmathi convinces the King to believe that Dayalan is trying to kill the king and take over the Kingdom. The king sentences his son to death. Dayalan escapes from the prison with the help of his friends. After many twists and turns, Dayalan succeeds in exposing the conspiracy by the prime minister and his son. The king realises his folly. Dunmathi and Prathapan are killed. Dayalan marries Padmavathi and crowned as King.

Cast 
The list is compiled from the film's song book.

Male cast
P. U. Chinnappa  Dayalan
T. R. Mahalingam  Bharathan
Kali N. Rathnam  Chadayan
P. G. Venkatesan  Sanyasi (Sergeant)
K. K. Perumal  Dunmathi
S. S. Kokko (Real name: Pasupuleti Srinivasulu Naidu)  Sokku
T. M. Ramasami  Arputhavarman (King)
E. R. Sahadevan  Prathapan
B. P. Ramalingam  Krupakarar
V. M. Ezhumalai  Vengan
N. V. Krishnan  Madavian

Female cast
K. V. Jayagowri  Padmavathi
P. S. Gnanam  Chilambu
C. T. Rajakantham  Alamu
S. S. Bhagyalakshmi  Manorama (Queen)
Ramani  Kanaga
Baby Jayalakshmi  Poor Girl
Dance
Kulkarni & Party, Rohini, Dhanam, Bala, Usha.

Production 
The film was produced by T. R. Sundaram under his own banner Modern Theatres and was directed by A. Mithra Das. The story was written by Kasi Viswanatha Pandian, the Elayaraja (Prince) of Ettayapuram. The dialogue was written by Kuppusami Kavi.

Soundtrack 
Tunes for almost all the songs were lifted from Hindi and Bengali. The song book gives the source for all songs. However, there is one song, Ullame Kavarnthu Ehinal, sung by P. U. Chinnappa in pure Carnatic raga SayadhaRanjani set to Adi Thalam. No music director was credited. Lyrics were penned by Maharaja Vaththiyar.
Song list

Reception 
Writing in 2014, Randor Guy said the film was only an average success at the box-office. He said, the film is remembered for "The performances by Chinnappa, Perumal, and melodious music and well-choreographed dances."

References

External links 
 - a song from the film sung by Kali N. Rathnam and P. S. Gnanam

Indian historical adventure films
Indian swashbuckler films
Films about royalty
1940s Tamil-language films
1940s historical adventure films